Julie Haydon (born Donella Donaldson, June 10, 1910 – December 24, 1994) was an American Broadway, film and television actress who received second billing as the female lead in the Ben Hecht–Charles MacArthur 1935 film vehicle for Noël Coward, The Scoundrel. After her Hollywood career ended in 1937, she turned to the theatre, originating the roles of Kitty Duval in The Time of Your Life (1939) and Laura Wingfield in The Glass Menagerie (1945).

Early career and films
Born in the Chicago suburb of Oak Park, to Orin Donaldson, a newspaper publisher, and Ella Horton, Haydon began her acting career when she was 19, touring with Minnie Maddern Fiske in Mrs. Bumstead Leigh. Within two years, she played Ophelia in a production of Hamlet at the Hollywood Playhouse.

Shortly after, she began appearing in films, in 1931.  Her first film, in which she was billed under her birth name, was The Great Meadow, a Johnny Mack Brown Western drama made by MGM.  In 1932, she signed with RKO, and her first major role came that year in The Conquerors, directed by William Wellman Her most notable performance came in 1935's The Scoundrel playing opposite Noël Coward, but, despite a new contract with MGM, only a few more films were to come in her short career, including A Family Affair (1937), the initial movie in the Andy Hardy series.

Some people, including Haydon, have held that it was Haydon and not Fay Wray who provided the heroine's bone-chilling screams in 1933's King Kong, but this claim is disputed.

Haydon retired from films in 1937.

Theatre

Haydon debuted on Broadway in 1935 in Bright Star by Philip Barry, which ran for only seven performances before closing. Her next Broadway production, Shadow and Substance by Paul Vincent Carroll, in which she played a saintly maid, was more successful, running for nine months in 1938. Next, in 1939, she created the role of the prostitute, Kitty Duval, in William Saroyan's Pulitzer Prize-winning The Time of Your Life. She also starred in the 1942 Broadway production of Saroyan's play Hello Out There. Haydon was the original Laura Wingfield in the first production of Tennessee Williams' The Glass Menagerie in 1945. Her final appearance on Broadway came in 1947's Our Lan.

Television
Beginning in 1949, Haydon began making appearances on television. She performed in episodes of Kraft Television Theater (1949), Armstrong Circle Theater (1950), The United States Steel Hour (1954), and Robert Montgomery Presents (1954).

Later career
In 1955, at the age of 45, Haydon married 73-year-old drama critic George Jean Nathan who died three years later. She never remarried and worked as a drama coach as well as appearing onstage in community theater and college productions. She delivered lectures taken from books written by Nathan, two collections of which Haydon edited.  She also wrote occasional magazine articles about the actors she had worked with in her career.

Haydon recorded two albums for Folkways Records in the early 1960s, George Jean Nathan's The New American Credo (1962) and Colette's Music Hall (L'Envers du Music-Hall): By Colette (1963).

In 1962, the actress left New York City and returned to the Midwest. For a decade, she was actress in residence at the College of St. Teresa in Winona, Minnesota.  She played the role of Amanda Wingfield in revivals of The Glass Menagerie, and in 1980, returned to New York to perform the role off-off-Broadway.

Death
Julie Haydon died on December 24, 1994, in La Crosse, Wisconsin of abdominal cancer, aged 84. She was buried next to her husband in the Cemetery of the Gate of Heaven in Hawthorne, New York.

The Nathan-Haydon papers were donated to the La Crosse Public Library archives.

Filmography

References

Sources
 New York Times, Julie Haydon Is Dead At 84; A Star in Glass Menagerie, December 29, 1994, Page B8.

External links

 
 
 
 
 
 Julie Haydon at Folkways

1910 births
1994 deaths
American film actresses
American stage actresses
American television actresses
Actors from Oak Park, Illinois
Deaths from cancer in Wisconsin
Burials at Gate of Heaven Cemetery (Hawthorne, New York)
20th-century American actresses